The 1981–82 Copa del Rey was the 80th staging of the Spanish Cup, the annual domestic cup competition in the Spanish football. The tournament was attended by 136 teams from the main categories of Spaniard football.

The tournament began on 30 August 1981 and ended on 13 April 1982 with the final, held in Nuevo José Zorrilla Stadium, in Valladolid. This field was opened two months earlier and was baptized as Stadium of Pneumonia because it was always cold there.

Real Madrid CF won their 15th title with a 2–1 victory over Sporting de Gijón, team that played their second consecutive final.

The defending champions, FC Barcelona, was defeated 1–0 (on aggregate score) by Atlético de Madrid in the round of 16.

Format 

 All rounds are played over two legs except the final which is played a single match in a neutral venue. The team that has the higher aggregate score over the two legs progresses to the next round.
 In case of a tie on aggregate, will play an extra time of 30 minutes, and if still tied, will be decided with a penalty shoot-outs.
 The teams that play European competitions are exempt until the round of 16 or when they are removed from the tournament.
 The winners of the competition will earn a place in the group stage of next season's UEFA Cup Winners' Cup, if they have not already qualified for European competition, if so then the runners-up will instead take this berth.

First round

Second round

Third round

Fourth round

Bracket

Round of 16 

|}

First leg

Second leg

Quarter-finals 

|}

First leg

Second leg

Semi-finals 

|}

First leg

Second leg

Final

References

External links 

  RSSSF
  Linguasport

Copa del Rey seasons
Copa del Rey
Copa del Rey